Preobrazheniye is an urban locality (an urban-type settlement) in Lazovsky District of Primorsky Krai, Russia, located on the Preobrazheniye Bay of the Sea of Japan. Population:

History
Founded on August 19, 1860 on the day of Transfiguration of Jesus, it was named "Preobrazheniye" (meaning transfiguration in Russian) after the event.

Economy
The main enterprise of the settlement is Preobrazhenskaya Base of Trawling Fleet.

Population

Population Progression

Climate
The climate of Preobrazheniye is monsoon climate, which is moderately warm and humid. Because of the influence of the Primorskoye Current, the winter is warmer than in the continental regions of the region, and the summer is cooler. The warmest months of the year are July, August and September. Spring is long and cool. Autumn, as a rule, comes somewhat slower than in the mainland regions of Russia. The average number of sunshine hours reaches 2,400, with most of them occurring in the winter, while the summer is characterized by a predominance of cloudy weather.

 The average annual air temperature is 5.9 °C
 The record maximum of 34.0 ° С
 The record minimum of -28.5 ° С
 The relative air humidity is 67%, which is less than in Astrakhan (70%), Khabarovsk (72%) and St. Petersburg (78%)
 The average wind speed is 3.3 m/s

References

Urban-type settlements in Primorsky Krai
Populated places established in 1860